The Tulu Cinemotsava 2015 is an award ceremony for Tulu films. The awards ceremony has been instituted to honour both artistic and technical excellence in Tulu language Film Industry.

Awards List
The Lifetime Achievement Awardwas conferred
on K N Tailor and Sanjeeva Dandakeri.
Emerging Actor Award (Male)- Arjun Kapikad
Emerging Actor Award (Female)- Deekshitha Acharya

Tulu Cinemostava Awards 2012–2013 (Jury)
Best Film - Rickshaw Driver
Best Actor (Male) - Shivadhwaj for Bangarda Kural
Best Actor (Female) - Pakhi Hegde for Bangarda Kural
Best Director - Ram Shetty for Bangarda Kural
Best Actor in a Comic Role - Navin D Padil for Telikeda Bolli
Best Male Playback Singer - Shankar Mahadevan Rickshaw Driver
Best Female Playback Singer - Sangeeta Balachandra for Bangarda Kural
Best Music Director - V.Manohar for Bangarda Kural
Best Choreography - Madan Harini for Bangarda Kural
Best Actor in a Negative Role - Suresh Kulal for Telikeda Bolli
Best Supporting Actor - Naveen D. Padil for Aamaitu Asal Emait Kusal
Best Supporting Actor - Devadas Kapikad for Telikeda Bolli
Best Supporting Actress - Padmaja Rao for Rickshaw Driver
Best Lyricist - Amrutha Someshwer for Bangarda Kural
Best Editor - Nasim Hakim Ansari for Bangarda Kural
Best Art Direction - Tamma Lakshman for Bangarda Kural
Best Dialogue - Devadas Kapikad for Telikeda Bolli
Best Story - Praveen Kumar Konchady for Rickshaw Driver
Best Cinematography - Raju K G for Bangarda Kural

Tulu Cinemostava Awards 2014 (Jury)
Best Film- Nirel
Best Actor (Male)- Venkatadri for Brahmashri Narayana Guru Swamy
Best Actor (Female)- Ramya Barna for Madime
Best Supporting Actor- Chethan Rai for Madime
Best Supporting Actress- Deepthi salian for Nirel
Best Actor in a Comic Role- Bhojaraj Vamanjoor for Madime
Best Actor in a Negative Role- Chethan Rai for Chaali Polilu
Best Story - Karthik R Gowda for Nirel
Best Dialogue- Shubhakar Bannanje for Brahmashri Narayana Guru Swamy
Best Art Direction- Tamma Lakshman for Madime
Best Choreography- Madan Harini for Madime
Best Choreography- Cool Jayanth for Chaali Polilu
Best cinematographer- Mani Kookal for Nirel
Best Lyricist - Vijay Kumar Kodialbail for Madime
Best Music Director - V.Manohar for Chaali Polilu
Best Male Playback Singer-Sonu Nigam for Madime
Best Female Playback Singer - Chithra for Madime
Best Editor - P V Mohan for Chaali Polilu
Best Director- Virendra Shetty Kavoor for Chaali Polilu

Tulu Cinemostava Awards 2012–2013 (Through Public Voting)
Best Film - Rickshaw Driver
Best Actor - Arjun Kapikad
Best Actress - Neha Saxena

Tulu Cinemostava Awards 2014 (Through Public Voting)
Best Film - Chaali Polilu
Best Actor - Naveen D Padil
Best Actress - Divyashree

List of Tulu Movies
List of tulu films of 2015
List of Tulu films of 2014
List of Released Tulu films
Tulu cinema
:Category:Actors in Tulu cinema
:Category:Actresses in Tulu cinema
Karnataka State Film Award for Best Regional film
RED FM Tulu Film Awards

References

2015 film awards

Tulu-language films